The Pressure Is On is the thirty-third studio album by American musician Hank Williams Jr. It was released by Elektra/Curb Records in August 1981 and was Williams' seventh studio album on the Elektra/Curb label.

Critical and commercial success
The Pressure Is On was Williams' fifth consecutive Top 10 album for Curb, peaking at number 5 on the Billboard Top Country Albums chart. Two songs, "All My Rowdy Friends (Have Settled Down)" and "A Country Boy Can Survive" were released as singles, with "All My Rowdy Friends" peaking at Number One on the Billboard Hot Country Songs & Tracks chart, giving Williams his fifth career Number One single, while "A Country Boy Can Survive" peaked at number 2. They have become signature songs for Williams and remain among the most popular of his career. The album and singles were well received by critics, earning Williams an Academy of Country Music nomination for Top Male Vocalist. It was also a major commercial success for Williams and was certified Platinum by the RIAA, making it Williams' sixth album to be certified Gold and his second to be certified Platinum.

Track listing

Personnel
Acoustic Guitar: Kenny Bell, Bobby Thompson, Paul Worley
Electric Guitar: Reggie Young, Billy Joe Walker Jr.
Drums: James Stroud
Steel Guitar: "Cowboy" Eddie Long, Sonny Garrish
Bass Guitar: Joe Osborn, Bob Wray
Piano: Larry Knechtel, Hargus "Pig" Robbins
Organ: Mike Lawler
Synthesizer: Tony Migliore
Mandolin: Vernon Derrick, Kieran Kane
Fiddle: Lisa Silver, Vernon Derrick
Viola: Buddy Spicher
Dobro: Mike Auldridge, Hank Williams, Jr.
Horns: Irve Kane (trombone), Terry Mead (trumpet), Jerry Vinett (clarinet)
Banjo: Bobby Thompson
Train Whistle: Boxcar Willie
Harmonica: Terry McMillan
Sitar: Reggie Young
Lead Vocals: Hank Williams Jr.
Guest Duck: Mack Vickery

Production
Produced by Jimmy Bowen
Recorded at Sounds Stage Studios, Nashville, Tennessee
Engineered by Ron Treat, Jimmy Bowen and Steve Tillisch
Mastered at Masterfonics by Glenn Meadows
Album Art Direction: Ron Caro and Norm Ung
Album Design by Norm Ung
Album Photography by Ron Slenzak

Chart performance

Weekly Charts

Year End Charts

Charting Singles

References

1981 albums
Hank Williams Jr. albums
Elektra Records albums
Curb Records albums
Albums produced by Jimmy Bowen